Hajji Rasul (also Romanized as Ḩājjī Rasūl) is a village in Nazil Rural District, Nukabad District, Khash County, Sistan and Baluchestan Province, Iran. At the 2006 census, its population was 221, in 47 families.

References 

Populated places in Khash County